Luxuslärm is a German pop-rock group from Iserlohn.

History 
The band was founded in 2003 as Blue Cinnamon, playing covers. In 2007, under the name Luxuslärm, the group won the NRW Rock It contest. In 2008, the band won several German Pop and Rock Music Association awards.

The group was selected as one of ten artists to compete in the German qualifiers for the Eurovision Song Contest 2016. German televoters however didn't select the band's entry  (lit. "As long as love lives within me") into the final of three.

Discography 
 2008 - 1000 km bis zum Meer
 2010 - So laut ich kann
 2011 - Carousel
 2014 - Alles was du willst
 2016 - Fallen und Fliegen

Members 
 Janine 'Jini' Meyer (vocals) - since 2006
 Jan Zimmer (drums) - since 2006
 Freddy Hau (guitar) - since 2011
 Christian Besch (keyboard) - since 2011
 David Müller (bass) - since 2011

Former members

 David Rempel (keyboard/guitar) - 2006 to 2011
 Eugen Urlacher (bass) - 2006 to 2011
 Henrik Oberbossel (guitar) - 2006 to 2011

Notes

External links 

  

German rock music groups